This is a list of high school athletic conferences in Ohio, separated by Ohio High School Athletic Association (OHSAA) region. Some conferences have schools in multiple regions, and will be listed in all applicable regions. However, the conference information is on the region page where the most schools are classified in.

Conference membership in Ohio is voluntary, rather than assigned by the state association like in some states. While this ensures that many rivalries stay intact regardless of classification changes, it also means schools can choose to change conferences pending acceptance into a different conference, or in rare cases, can be forced out of a conference. This can explain why some conferences have a lengthy list of former members, and the number of defunct conferences.

Central Region

This region includes the counties of Delaware, Franklin, Knox, Licking, Madison, Morrow, and Union, as well as schools within Fairfield, Marion, and Pickaway counties. While the Central Region includes a small number of conferences, many of these leagues contain many schools with multiple divisions.

 Central Catholic League
 Columbus City League
 Knox-Morrow Athletic Conference
 Licking County League
 Mid-Ohio Athletic Conference
 Mid-Ohio Christian Athletic League
 Mid-State League
 Ohio Capital Conference

East/Southeast Regions

The East region includes the counties of Belmont, Carroll, Coshocton, Guernsey, Harrison, Holmes, Jefferson, Monroe, Morgan, Muskingum, Noble, and Tuscarawas, as well as schools within Washington County. The Southeast region includes the counties of Adams, Athens, Fayette, Gallia, Highland, Hocking, Jackson, Lawrence, Meigs, Perry, Pike, Ross, Scioto, and Vinton, as well as schools within Brown, Fairfield, Pickaway, and Washington counties. Due to the low amount of conferences separately, and the number of conferences that contain members of both regions, these two regions are combined onto one page.

 Buckeye 8 Athletic League
 East Central Ohio League
 Frontier Athletic Conference
 Independents
 Inter-Valley Conference
 Muskingum Valley League
 Ohio Valley Athletic Conference
 Ohio Valley Conference
 Pioneer Valley Conference
 Scioto Valley Conference
 Southern Hills Athletic Conference
 Southern Ohio Conference
 Tri-Valley Conference

Northeast Region

This region includes the counties of Ashtabula, Columbiana, Cuyahoga, Geauga, Lake, Lorain, Mahoning, Medina, Portage, Stark, Summit, Trumbull, and Wayne, as well as schools within Ashland and Erie counties.

 Akron City Series
 All-American Conference
 Chagrin Valley Conference
 Cleveland Senate Athletic League
 Eastern Buckeye Conference
 Eastern Ohio Athletic Conference
 Federal League
 Great Lakes Conference
 Greater Cleveland Conference
 Independents
 Lake Erie League
Lorain County 8
 Metro Athletic Conference
 Mahoning Valley Athletic Conference
 North Coast League
 Northeastern Athletic Conference
 Northeast 8 Athletic Conference
 Portage Trail Conference
 Principals Athletic Conference
 Southwestern Conference
 Suburban League
 Wayne County Athletic League
 Western Reserve Conference

Northwest Region

This region includes the counties of Allen, Auglaize, Crawford, Defiance, Fulton, Hancock, Hardin, Henry, Huron, Lucas, Mercer, Ottawa, Paulding, Putnam, Richland, Sandusky, Seneca, Van Wert, Williams, Wood, and Wyandot, as well as schools within Ashland, Erie, and Marion counties.

 Blanchard Valley Conference
 Buckeye Border Conference
 Firelands Conference
 Green Meadows Conference
 Mid-Buckeye Conference
 Midwest Athletic Conference
 Northern 10 Athletic Conference
 Northern Buckeye Conference
 Northern Lakes League
 Northwest Central Conference
 Northwest Conference
 Northwest Ohio Athletic League
 Ohio Cardinal Conference
 Putnam County League
 Sandusky Bay Conference
 Sandusky River League
 Three Rivers Athletic Conference
 Toledo Area Athletic Conference
 Toledo City League
 Western Buckeye League

Southwest Region

This region includes the counties of Butler, Champaign, Clark, Clermont, Clinton, Darke, Greene, Hamilton, Logan, Miami, Montgomery, Preble, Shelby, and Warren, as well as schools within Brown County.

 Central Buckeye Conference
 Cincinnati Hills League
 Cincinnati Metro Athletic Conference
 Cross County Conference
 Dayton City League
 Eastern Cincinnati Conference
 Greater Catholic League
 Greater Miami Conference
 Greater Western Ohio Conference
 Independents
 Metro Buckeye Conference
 Miami Valley Conference
Miami Valley League
 Ohio Heritage Conference 
 Shelby County Athletic League
 Southern Buckeye Athletic/Academic Conference
 Southwest Ohio Conference
 Southwestern Buckeye League
 Western Ohio Athletic Conference

Defunct conferences

Notes and references